Risto Ryti's second cabinet was the 24th government of Republic of Finland. Cabinet's time period was from March 27, 1940 to January 4, 1941. It was Majority government.

 

Ryti, 2
1940 establishments in Finland
1941 disestablishments in Finland
Cabinets established in 1940
Cabinets disestablished in 1941